Berendina Johanna "Bets" Dekens (later de Vries, 25 October 1906 – 13 August 1992) was a Dutch discus thrower. She competed at the 1928 Summer Olympics and finished in 17th place with her all-time best throw of 29.36 meters.

This was the first women's track and field event to be completed in Olympic Games history.

References

External links
 

1906 births
1992 deaths
Dutch female discus throwers
Olympic athletes of the Netherlands
Athletes (track and field) at the 1928 Summer Olympics
Sportspeople from Groningen (city)
20th-century Dutch women